Afanasyevo is a rural locality (a village) in Slednevskoye Rural Settlement, Alexandrovsky District, Vladimir Oblast, Russia. The population was 88 as of 2010. There are 10 streets.

Geography 
Afanasyevo is located 5 km north of Alexandrov (the district's administrative centre) by road. Naumovo is the nearest rural locality.

References 

Rural localities in Alexandrovsky District, Vladimir Oblast
Alexandrovsky Uyezd (Vladimir Governorate)